The World Group was the highest level of Fed Cup competition in 2016.

Draw

First round

Romania vs Czech Republic

Germany vs. Switzerland

France vs. Italy

Russia vs. Netherlands 

The match between Kuznetsova and Hogenkamp, which lasted for 4 hours, became the longest singles match in the history of the Fed Cup.

Semifinals

Switzerland vs. Czech Republic

France vs. Netherlands

Final

France vs. Czech Republic

References 

World Group